Myioscotiptera is a genus of parasitic flies in the family Tachinidae. There is one described species in Myioscotiptera, M. cincta.

Distribution
Mexico.

References

Dexiinae
Diptera of North America
Tachinidae genera
Taxa named by Ermanno Giglio-Tos
Monotypic Brachycera genera